Migrant may refer to:

Human migration
Human migration, including:
Emigration, leaving one's resident country with the intent to settle elsewhere
Immigration, movement into a country with the intent to settle
Economic migrant, someone who emigrates from one region to another to seek an improvement in living standards
Internal migration, within one geopolitical entity, usually a nation-state
Migrant worker, one who migrates, possibly to another country, for work
Expatriate

Other uses
Bird migration, regular seasonal movement of birds between breeding and wintering grounds
Migrant (album), by American rock band The Dear Hunter

See also
 Migrant literature
 Migration (disambiguation)
 Immigrant (disambiguation)
 The Emigrants (disambiguation)